Hippach is a municipality in the Schwaz district in the Austrian state of Tyrol.

Geography
Hippach lies in the Ziller valley west of the Ziller.

References

Cities and towns in Schwaz District